Knockbride is a parish in County Cavan, Ireland located outside the town of Bailieborough. There are two Roman Catholic churches namely West Knockbride and East Knockbride. There is also a Church of Ireland church and parish and a Presbyterian Church in Corraneary.  There is one shop, McCabes. Knockbride has two pubs, "The Bridge Tavern" and "The Hideout".

Notable people
John Tierney: Former Cavan Gaelic footballer
Michael, Peter & Larry Reilly: Brothers & Former Cavan Gaelic footballers
 Fifteen to One and Countdown contestant John Clarke is from Knockbride. He is famous for saying the word "wanker" on the Countdown show.
 Sir Edward Lucas, poet, politician, and agent for South Australia in London from 1918 to 1921, son of Adams Lucas, was born in Gallon Etra townland, Knockbride, in 1857. (Reference: Australian Dictionary of National Biography)
 Chris Noth, actor, whose ancestors emigrated from Knockbride in the 1840s

References

Civil parishes of County Cavan